"I've Always Been Crazy" is a song written and recorded by American country music artist Waylon Jennings. It was released in June 1978 as the first single and title track from his 1978 album I've Always Been Crazy. The song became his sixth number one on the country chart as a solo artist. The single stayed at number one for three weeks and spent a total of thirteen weeks on the chart.

Single and album edits
The single version, released for radio airplay and commercial single release, cuts out an instrumental bridge in the middle of the song, and has an earlier fade. However, most radio stations that play "I've Always Been Crazy" as an oldie play the full album version.

Chart performance

References

1978 singles
1978 songs
Waylon Jennings songs
Songs written by Waylon Jennings
RCA Records singles